The Yeoman Football Club is an Australian rules football club based in Burnie, Tasmania, which plays its home games at Wivenhoe Showgrounds, Burnie. It competes in the Darwin Football Association, running Senior and Reserve Grade sides.

Formation

Yeoman was formed around 1895 and originally competed in junior competitions prior to World War I. It became a senior club when it was invited to compete in the North West Football Union in 1920. Originally based in Elliott, Tasmania, they moved their headquarters to Wynyard, Tasmania in 1922.  In September 1924 they changed their name to Wynyard Football Club, to better represent their municipality, despite their already being another club by that name.

Competitions
Prior to World War I – Yeoman competed in junior competitions.
1920-32 – North West Football Union
1940-41 – Darwin Football Association
1945-50 – North West Football Union
1951- – Darwin Football Association

Home ground
Yeoman currently plays its home games at Wivenhoe Showgrounds, Wivenhoe. Prior to this, the club was based at Les Clark Oval, Cooee.

Premierships
PREVIOUS DARWIN FOOTBALL ASSOCIATION
1940: Yeoman 13.11 (89) d Wynyard 7.15 (57)

CURRENT DARWIN FOOTBALL ASSOCIATION
SENIOR GRADE
1951: Yeoman 8.17 (65) d Tewkesbury 2.3 (15)
1952: Yeoman 8.7 (55) d Somerset 6.8 (44)
1978: Yeoman 14.10 (94) d Ridgley 10.12 (72) 
1993
1998

RESERVE GRADE
1978
1992
1995
1996
1997

UNDER 17 GRADE
1999 (Combined side with Ridgley)

References

External links
Yeoman AFC Official Club Website
Yeoman FC – australianfootball.com

Australian rules football clubs in Tasmania